Rossimyiops is a genus of parasitic flies in the family Tachinidae. There are about seven described species in Rossimyiops.

Species
These seven species belong to the genus Rossimyiops:
 Rossimyiops achilleae
 Rossimyiops austrinus
 Rossimyiops djerbaensis
 Rossimyiops exquisitus
 Rossimyiops longicornis
 Rossimyiops subapertus
 Rossimyiops whiteheadi Mesnil, 1953

References

Further reading

 
 
 
 

Tachinidae
Articles created by Qbugbot